Kornilovskaya is a station on the Troitskaya line of the Moscow Metro which is currently under construction. It will open in 2024. Before October 2021 it was known as Mamyri (. The new name was given after Admiral Kornilov Street nearby.

Gallery

References 

Moscow Metro stations
Troitskaya line